Ruffini is an Italian surname. Notable people with the surname include:

Alessandro "Sandro" Ruffini (1889–1954), Italian actor and voice actor
Angelo Ruffini (1864–1929), Italian histologist and embryologist
Attilio Ruffini (1924–2011), Italian politician
Ernesto Ruffini (1888–1967), Archbishop of Palermo
Frederick Ernst Ruffini (1851-1885), American architect
Giovanni Ruffini (1807–1881), Italian poet and librettist
Giulano Ruffini (born 1945), French art collector
Giuseppe or Joseph Ruffini (1690 - 1749), Italian-Austrian painter
Luca Ruffini (born 1997), Italian footballer
Oscar Ruffini (1858-1957), American architect
Paolo Ruffini (1765–1822), Italian mathematician and philosopher
Paolo Ruffini (actor) (born 1978), Italian actor and presenter
Patrick Ruffini, Republican Party pollster and political strategist
Remo Ruffini (businessman) (born 1961), Italian billionaire businessman
Silvia Ruffini (1475–1561), Italian noble woman and mistress of Cardinal Alessandro Farnese
Simone Ruffini (born 1989), Italian swimmer
Stefano Ruffini (1963–2006), Italian singer and voice actor

See also
Eugen Ruffínyi (1846–1924), Slovak mining engineer and amateur speleologist; the original family name was probably "Ruffini"

Italian-language surnames